Bonomy is a Scottish surname. Notable people with the surname include:

 Iain Bonomy, Lord Bonomy (born 1946), Scottish judge
 John Bonomy (1918–1980), Scottish footballer

See also
 Bonomi

Surnames of Scottish origin